Lady Mary Rachel Pepys, DCVO (née Fitzalan-Howard, 27 June 1905 – 17 August 1992) was a lady-in-waiting to Princess Marina, Duchess of Kent, from 1943 to 1968. She was the eldest child of Henry Fitzalan-Howard, 15th Duke of Norfolk and his wife, Gwendolen Constable-Maxwell, 12th Lady Herries of Terregles.

On 31 July 1939, she married Lt. Col. Colin Keppel Davidson, a grandson of William Keppel, 7th Earl of Albemarle, and they had two children: Duncan Henry Davidson (b. 1941) and Harriet Mary (b. 1942), who married Michael Sefi, the current Keeper of the Royal Philatelic Collection.

Lady Rachel's first husband was killed in Tunisia during the Second World War. On 9 November 1961, she married Brigadier Anthony Hilton Pepys, who died six years later. She retired from the Duchess of Kent's household a year later and died in 1992, aged 87.

References

1905 births
1992 deaths
Daughters of British dukes
Daughters of barons
British Roman Catholics
Dames Commander of the Royal Victorian Order
Rachel Pepys
Place of birth missing
Place of death missing